The Royal Titles Act 1953 (1 & 2 Eliz 2 c 9) is an Act of the Parliament of the United Kingdom. It authorizes the Queen to alter her style and titles for the United Kingdom as well as territories whose foreign relations are under the responsibility of Her Majesty's Government in the United Kingdom.

A royal proclamation was made under the Act on 28 May 1953. It defined the Queen's titles as:

 in English:

 in Latin:

See also 

 Royal Style and Titles Act

References 

United Kingdom Acts of Parliament 1953
Titles in the United Kingdom
1953 in the British Empire